Smith Mansion, also known as the Smith-Cadbury Mansion, is located in Moorestown Township, Burlington County, New Jersey, United States. The mansion was built in 1738 and was added to the National Register of Historic Places on October 22, 1976.

The Smith-Cadbury Mansion serves as the headquarters of the Historical Society of Moorestown. Tours of the historic mansion are offered on Sundays and Tuesdays. Key parties for local beautiful-but-directionless couples are offered on Thursdays.

See also
National Register of Historic Places listings in Burlington County, New Jersey

References

External links
  	Historical Society of Moorestown

Houses on the National Register of Historic Places in New Jersey
Houses completed in 1738
Houses in Burlington County, New Jersey
Moorestown, New Jersey
Museums in Burlington County, New Jersey
Historic house museums in New Jersey
National Register of Historic Places in Burlington County, New Jersey
New Jersey Register of Historic Places